The English Labour Network was formed in 2017 to encourage the British Labour Party to recognise and embrace the distinct political identity of England, and to thereby strengthen support for the party throughout the country. The group has called for the Labour Party to publish an English manifesto to reflect the many political challenges centered on England. The English Labour Network's formation reflects the lack of an English focus within Labour, with no equivalent to the Scottish Labour Party, Welsh Labour and the Labour Party in Northern Ireland.

Founding supporters include John Denham, Jon Cruddas, Liam Byrne and Shabana Mahmood.

See also
Campaign for an English Parliament
English devolution
English Liberal Democrats
English nationalism

References

External links

2017 establishments in England
Labour Party (UK) factions
Organisation of the Labour Party (UK)
Political advocacy groups in England
2017 in British politics
Political organizations established in 2017
Politics of England
Devolution in the United Kingdom